Gloria Guinness previously Gloria von Fürstenberg, née Rubio y Alatorre (27 August 1912 – 9 November 1980) was a Mexican socialite and fashion and cultural icon, as well as a contributing editor to Harper's Bazaar from 1963 to 1971, considered to be one of the most elegant women of all time. She was portrayed by Cecil Beaton, Slim Aarons, Alejo Vidal-Quadras, etc., designed for by Cristóbal Balenciaga, Elsa Schiaparelli, Hubert de Givenchy, Yves Saint-Laurent amongst others, as well as a close friend and inspiration to Truman Capote.

Family and childhood 
Gloria Rubio y Alatorre was born in Guadalajara, Mexico. She was the daughter of José Rafael Rubio y Torres (1880, Michoacán, México – 1917, San Antonio, Texas), a liberal journalist who supported Francisco I. Madero for which he died in exile in the United States, and his wife Maria Luisa Alatorre de la Cueva y Diaz-Ocampo (b. 1882, Zapotlán el Grande, Jalisco), who belonged to a Spanish colonial landowning family from Jalisco who made their fortune in sugar (descendants of conquistador Don Diego de Ochoa-Garibay), partly described by their relative, five times Nobel Prize nominee, Alfonso Reyes Ochoa, in his book Parentalia.

Through her maternal family, Gloria was a niece of Gaspar Rubio de Tejada y Benavente (cousin of the celebrated 19th-century art collector Ramón de Errazu y Rubio de Tejada), and of Jesús Colón de Larreátegui y Vallarta (direct descendant of the 1st Duke of Veragua, eldest son of Christopher Columbus). Gloria had two elder siblings: Rafael and Maria Luisa.

Gloria's childhood was unstable, mainly because of her father's political persecution during the Mexican Revolution and early death in exile (due to health complications at a health clinic in San Antonio, Texas, when Gloria was five years old). She and her siblings spent most of their childhood at the fincas and haciendas of her mother's relatives, such as the Ochoa-Garibay, Villaseñor-Jasso and Sánchez de Aldana families, with whom the Rubios lived for periods of time. Nevertheless, the Cristero War in Jalisco forced both them and their relatives to leave the countryside for Mexico City, where she eventually met her first husband.

Legendary origins 
Without any known explanation, Guinness frequently downplayed or directly lied about her origins, often saying she was from Veracruz, that her father was a revolutionary soldier killed in action and that her mother was either a laundry maid or a seamstress. Her mysterious true origins were cause of numerous rumors and speculation, many intended to diminish her social position, but eventually did little to destroy her reputation as "the most elegant woman in the World", in the words of Eleanor Lambert, founder of the Met Gala, New York Fashion Week and the International Best Dressed List.

Marriages and descendants 
Gloria Rubio was married four times.  

Her first marriage, to Jacobus Hendrik Franciscus Scholtens, the Dutch director of a sugar refinery estate in Veracruz took place in Mexico City on 31 March 1933. Rubio was 20, and the groom, a son of Jan Scholtens and Maria Le Comte, was 47. They separated shortly afterwards and finally divorced in 1935 (with no issue).

Her second marriage was to Franz-Egon Maria Meinhard Engelbert Pius Aloysius Kaspar Ferdinand Dietrich, third Graf von Fürstenberg-Herdringen (1896–1975), whom she married on 4 October 1935, in Kensington, London, England; this being the second marriage to both and making her a stepmother of actress Betsy von Furstenberg. They were the parents of:

 Dolores Maria Agatha Wilhelmine Luise, Freiin von Fürstenberg-Hedringen (31 July 1936 – 20 January 2012). She married Patrick Benjamin Guinness (her stepbrother) on 22 October 1955, who died in 1965 in a car accident in Switzerland. They were the parents of:
 Maria Alexandra Guinness (b. 1956), who married Foulques, Count de Quatrebarbes (b. 1948), with issue, in 1979, and, after their divorce, Neville Cook.
 Loel Patrick Guinness (b. 1957)
 Victoria Guinness (b. 1960), who married Philip Niarchos in 1984, son of Greek shipping magnate Stavros Niarchos, with issue.
 Franz-Egon Engelbert Raphael Christophorus Hubertus, 4th Graf von Fürstenberg-Hedringen (born 27 July 1939 in Berlin-Wilmersdorf). He married Agneta Sundby (born 12 April 1943), a Swedish model on 20 August 1967, in Visnum church, Visnum, Sweden. After their divorce, he married Adelina von Fürstenberg (née Cuberyan).

Her third marriage was to Ahmad-Abu-El-Fotouh Fakhry Bey (1921–1998), whom she married in 1946 and divorced in 1949. He was a grandson of King Fuad I of Egypt, as the only child of Princess Fawkia of Egypt, Countess Wladimir d’Adix-Dellmensingen, and her first husband, Mahmud Fakhry Pasha. Through his mother he was a nephew of King Farouk I of Egypt and Queen Fawzia of Iran (first wife of Mohammed Reza Pahlavi, Shah of Iran). (No issue came from this marriage).

Her fourth, and final, marriage was to Group Captain Thomas Loel Guinness (1906–1988), Member of Parliament, shareholder of Guinness Mahon, as a member of the banking branch of the Guinness family. They married on 7 April 1951, in Antibes. By this marriage, she had three stepchildren: Patrick Benjamin Guinness (1931–1965), married to her daughter Dolores; William Loel Seymour Guinness (born 1939), and Belinda Guinness (1941-2020), wife of Sheridan Hamilton-Temple-Blackwood, 5th Marquess of Dufferin and Ava.

Among Guinness's alleged lovers in-between her successive marriages were David Beatty, 2nd Earl Beatty, and the British ambassador to France Duff Cooper.

Fashion and cultural icon
At an advanced age Guinness began to frequently write for Harper's Bazaar. She famously asserted, in the magazine's July 1963 issue, that "Elegance is in the brain as well as the body and in the soul. Jesus Christ is the only example we have of any one human having possessed all three at the same time."

Artist's subject 
She was painted by artists like René Bouché, Kenneth Paul Block and Alejo Vidal-Quadras. She was photographed for Vogue, Harper's Bazaar and Women's Wear Daily by Cecil Beaton, Richard Avedon, John Rawlings, Toni Frissell, Horst P. Horst, Slim Aarons and Henry Clarke.

Capote's swans 
Gloria was named by Truman Capote as one of his "swans", a group which included Lee Radziwill, Marella Agnelli, Gloria Vanderbilt, Babe Paley, Diana Vreeland, and others, which he used as inspiration for his characters, most notably in his chapter "La Côte Basque 1965".

Fashion 
Guinness was dressed by various top-couture designers like Cristóbal Balenciaga, Elsa Schiaparelli, Marc Bohan at Christian Dior, Chanel, Hubert de Givenchy, Yves Saint Laurent, Valentino Garavani, Halston and shoes by Roger Vivier.

She was one of the first models to wear capri pants by Emilio Pucci.

Among the seventeen outfits, twelve hats and pairs of shoes that she donated were a 1948 Balenciaga evening gown of organdy with flock flowers, an evening gown from 1965, a 1949 hand-painted evening gown by Marcelle Chaumont and a 1950s evening gown by Jeanne Lafaurie, the only dress by that designer in the collection of Victoria & Albert Museum.

The most elegant woman in the world

Despite being voted in second place at Time magazine's "Best Dressed Woman In the World" in 1962, only after the then First Lady of the United States, Jacqueline Kennedy, Eleanor Lambert famously asserted that without a doubt Gloria Guinness was "to me, the most elegant woman in the World".

She appeared on the International Best Dressed List from 1959 through 1963. The year after, she was elevated into its Hall of Fame.

Design and properties
The Guinnesses had an apartment in Manhattan's Waldorf Towers, an 18th-century farmhouse called Villa Zanroc in Epalinges near Lausanne, a 350-ton yacht, an apartment on Avenue Matignon in Paris, decorated by Georges Geffroy, a stud farm in Normandy, Haras de Piencourt, and Gemini, a mansion at Manalapan, Florida.

The Florida property, which is divided by U.S. Highway A1A, faces the lake on one side and the ocean on the other; the two halves of the building, which was designed in the 1940s by architect Marion Syms Wyeth for Gerald Lambert, were ingeniously connected by a sound-proofed living room that was set beneath the bisecting road. In addition, the Guinnesses built a house in Acapulco, Mexico, designed by Mexican architect Marco Aldaco. They also kept three aircraft: an Avro Commander for short trips around Europe, a small jet, and a helicopter for Loel Guinness's hops between the Manalapan house and the Palm Beach golf course.

Rumor of espionage
In a series of supposedly nonfiction books written by Aline Griffith, Countess of Romanones (self-proclaimed spy for the Americans in neutral Spain during World War II), she stated that the glamorous "Countess von Fürstenberg", an almost legendary character by this point, and her German husband had maintained social relations with important Nazis, including Hermann Göring and even Adolf Hitler himself, accusing them of espionage for the Axis. No other arguments have appeared to back Griffith's claims.

Death 
In 1980, Gloria Guinness died of a heart attack at Villa Zanroc in Epalinges.  She is buried next to her last husband at the Bois de Vaux Cemetery in Lausanne, who was transferred there after his death in a health clinic in Houston, Texas, in 1988.

See also
 House of Fürstenberg (Westphalia)
 King Fuad I of Egypt
 Guinness family
 Alfonso Reyes
 Aline Griffith

Notes

References
 No author. "Thomas L.E.B. Guinness Weds", The New York Times, 8 April 1951.
 Ballard, Bettina, In My Fashion, New York: David McKay, 1960.
 Donovan, Carrie, "Mrs. Guinness: Rare Fashion Leader; Couturiers Are Guided by Her Personal Style Flair Has Plan for Dressing for Four Homes in Varied Locales", The New York Times, 5 December 1961.
 No author. "The Rich: Having a Marvelous Time", Time, 26 January 1962.
 Guinness, Gloria, "Gloria On Elegance", Harper's Bazaar, July 1963.
 Guinness, Gloria, Gloria Guinness, New York: Hearst, 1966.
 Bender, Marylin, The Beautiful People, New York: Coward-McCann, 1967.
 Nemy, Enid, "Venice Draws International Set; Masked Ball to Aid City's Craftsmen Gala to Be in Palace on the Grand Canal", The New York Times, 4 September 1967.
 Bender, Marylin, "A Prize for Mrs. Guinness", The New York Times, 2 November 1967.
 Klemesrud, Judy, "They Expected a Snob, They Heard a Comedian", The New York Times, 3 December 1970.
 Ginsburg, Madeleine, Fashion: An Anthology by Cecil Beaton, London: Victoria and Albert Museum, 1971.
 No author. "Gloria Guinness, 67, Trend-Setter In Fashion and Hospitality, Dead", The New York Times, 10 November 1980.
 Payn, Graham and Sheridan Morley, editors, The Noel Coward Diaries, Londong: Weidenfeld and Nicolson, 1982.
 Jouve, Marie-Andree and Jacqueline Demornex, editors, Balenciaga, Paris: Editions du Regard, 1988.
 Genealogisches Handbuch des Adels, Freiherrliche Häuser, Band XV, Seite 135–177, Band 69 der Gesamtreihe, C. A. Starke Verlag, Limburg (Lahn) 1989.
 Join-Dieterle, Catherine, Train, Susan and Lepicard, Marie-Jose, Givenchy – 40 Ans de Creation, Paris: Paris-Musees, 1991.
 Tapert, Annette & Edkins, Diana, The Power of Style - The Women Who Defined The Art of Living Well, Crown Publishers, New York, 1994.
 Jouve, Marie-Andrée, Fashion Memoir - Balenciaga, London: Thames and Hudson, 1997.
 Plimpton, George, Truman Capote, In which various Friends, Enemies, Acquaintances, and Detractors recall his Turbulent Career, New York: Nan A. Talese, 1997.
 Mohrt, Françoise, Le style Givenchy, New York: Editions Assouline, 1998.
 Mower, Sarah, Oscar De La Renta, New York: Assouline, 2002.
 Mosley, Charles, Burke's Peerage and Baronetage, 107th edition, volume 2, p. 1695.
 Vickers, Hugo, The Unexpurgated Beaton: The Cecil Beaton Diaries as He Wrote Them, 1970–1980, New York: Knopf, 2003.
 Horyn, Cathy, "On the Block, Grande Dame Décor", The New York Times, 13 March 2003.
 Zilkha, Bettina, Ultimate Style-The Best Of The Best Dressed List, New York: Assouline, 2004.
 Wilcox, Clarie, The Golden Age of Couture - Paris and London 1947–57, London: V&A Publications, 2007.
 Werle, Simone, Fashionista: A Century of Style Icons, Prestel Publishing, 2009.
 Killen, Mary,  "Make Mine A Guinness", Tatler, November 2009.
 Fiori, Pamela, "The Glory of Gloria Guinness", Harper's Bazaar, October 2010, pp. 273–280.

1912 births
1980 deaths
Gloria
20th-century Mexican writers
Writers from Guadalajara, Jalisco
Mexican socialites
American socialites
German socialites
British socialites
French socialites